SB-228357 is a drug which acts as an antagonist for the 5HT2B and 5HT2C receptors. It has antidepressant and anxiolytic effects in animal models, and inhibits 5-HT2B mediated proliferation of cardiac fibroblasts.

See also 
 RS-102221
 SB-242084
 SB-243213

References 

5-HT2C antagonists
Indoles
Ureas
3-Pyridyl compounds